Wyong railway station is located on the Main Northern line in New South Wales, Australia. It serves the northern Central Coast suburb of Wyong.

History

Wyong station was opened on 15 August 1887. In 1912, the line was duplicated. In 1937, the eastern platform was converted to an island platform. A pair of passing loops were added south of the station in 1948. In the 1950s, a new bridge was built over Wyong Creek immediately south of the station, with the old railway bridge becoming part of the Pacific Highway.

Between April 1982 and June 1984, Wyong was the northern extremity of the electrified network. A brick building on Platforms 1 and 2 was replaced by the current structure in the 1990s. On 1 November 1993, an upgraded footbridge with a new ticket office and lifts was opened by Minister for Transport Bruce Baird.

Platforms & services

Wyong has three platforms, one island with two faces and one side platform. It is serviced by NSW TrainLink Central Coast & Newcastle line services travelling from Sydney Central to Newcastle. Peak-hour services to and from Central and Blacktown via the North Shore line also terminate at Wyong.

It is also serviced by NSW Trainlink Xplorer and XPT long-distance services from Sydney to Armidale, Moree, Grafton, Casino and Brisbane.

Transport links

Busways operate seven routes via Wyong station:
78: Westfield Tuggerah to Lake Haven via Warnervale station
79: Westfield Tuggerah to Lake Haven via Hamlyn Terrace & Woongarrah
80: Westfield Tuggerah to Lake Haven via Old Pacific Highway & Wyong Hospital
81: Westfield Tuggerah to Lake Haven via Wattanobbi, Johns Road & Wyongah
82: Westfield Tuggerah to Lake Haven via Tacoma & Wyongah
93: Westfield Tuggerah to Noraville
94: Westfield Tuggerah to Budgewoi

Coastal Liner operate four routes via Wyong station:
10: Westfield Tuggerah to Warnervale station
11: Westfield Tuggerah to Lake Haven
12: Westfield Tuggerah to Dooralong via Durren Durren
13: to Westfield Tuggerah to Lemon Tree via Warnervale station

Red Bus Services operate seven routes via Wyong station:
15: to The Entrance
16: Wyong to The Entrance
19: to Gosford station via Bateau Bay
24: to The Entrance via Berkeley Vale & Glenning Valley (combined 25/26 service)
25: to The Entrance via Glenning Valley
26: Wyong Hospital to The Entrance via Berkeley Vale
30: to South Tacoma

References

External links

Wyong station details Transport for New South Wales
Wyong Station Public Transport Map Transport for NSW

Transport on the Central Coast (New South Wales)
Easy Access railway stations in New South Wales
Railway stations in Australia opened in 1887
Regional railway stations in New South Wales
Main North railway line, New South Wales